Manding may be:
One of the Manding languages
Specifically the Mandinka language